CCPN can refer to any one of the following:
 Collaborative Computing Project for NMR - A project for computational aspects NMR spectroscopy.
 Corpus Christi Terminal Railroad - Which has railroad reporting mark CCPN.